Hrdějovice is a municipality and village in České Budějovice District in the South Bohemian Region of the Czech Republic. It has about 1,600 inhabitants. The folk architecture in Opatovice village in the municipality is well preserved and is protected by law as a village monument zone.

Administrative parts
The village of Opatovice is an administrative part of Hrdějovice.

History
The first written mention of Hrdějovice is from 1350 and of Opatovice from 1378. From 1661 to abolition of serfdom in 1850, it belonged to Hluboká manor owned by the Schwarzenberg family.

Sights
Baroque Chapel of the Virgin Mary from the mid-18th century, rebuilt in 1876
Pilgrimage chapel with a healing well
Memorial to those killed in World War I
Folk Baroque style houses
Memorial to remember the tragic air crash of 18 July 1924

Notable people
František Mareš (1857–1942), physiologist, philosopher and politician

Gallery

References

External links

Villages in České Budějovice District